Hirnyk is an urban-type settlement in Chervonohrad Raion, Lviv Oblast (region) of Ukraine. It belongs to Chervonohrad urban hromada, one of the hromadas of Ukraine. Population: . 

Until 18 July 2020, Hirnyk belonged to Chervonohrad Municipality. As part of the administrative reform of Ukraine, which reduced the number of raions of Lviv Oblast to seven, Chervonohrad Municipality was merged into newly established Chervonohrad Raion.

References

Urban-type settlements in Chervonohrad Raion
Populated places established in the Ukrainian Soviet Socialist Republic
Chervonohrad